Ernests Reihmanis (born 5 November 1900, date of death unknown) was a Latvian weightlifter. He competed in the men's light-heavyweight event at the 1924 Summer Olympics.

References

External links
 

1900 births
Year of death missing
Latvian male weightlifters
Olympic weightlifters of Latvia
Weightlifters at the 1924 Summer Olympics
Place of birth missing